Vlado Šćepanović (born 13 November 1975) is a Montenegrin professional basketball coach and former player. At , he played the shooting guard position.

Professional career
Šćepanović began his professional career with Budućnost during the 1993–94 season. In 2000 he moved to Turkey and signed with Efes Pilsen. In the 2001–02 season, Šćepanović played with Partizan.

Šćepanović moved to Skipper Bologna in 2002, before returning to Partizan in 2004. He then spent three years in Greece, with Panathinaikos and PAOK, and three years in Spain, with Granada and Murcia.

In February 2011, Šćepanović signed with Panellinios until the end of the 2010–11 season.

National team career
Playing with Serbia and Montenegro/FR Yugoslavia, Šćepanović won the gold medal at the 1998 FIBA World Championship, the bronze medal at the 1999 EuroBasket and gold again at the 2001 EuroBasket. He also took part in the 2000 and 2004 Summer Olympics, as well as at the 2005 EuroBasket.

After Montenegro gained independence, he represented their senior national team at the 2011 EuroBasket.

Coaching career
On 24 June 2016, Šćepanović was named the head coach of Budućnost. On 13 November 2016, he resigned from the position of Budućnost head coach.

On 9 July 2020, Šćepanović was named the head coach for Partizan of the ABA League and the Basketball League of Serbia after serving two years as an assistant coach in their staff. He parted ways with the team on 30 October.

See also 
 List of KK Partizan head coaches
 List of Serbia and Montenegro men's national basketball team players

References

External links

 Vlado Šćepanović at acb.com
 Vlado Šćepanović at legabasket.it
 Vlado Šćepanović at euroleague.net

1975 births
Living people
1998 FIBA World Championship players
Anadolu Efes S.K. players
Basketball players at the 2000 Summer Olympics
Basketball players at the 2004 Summer Olympics
CB Granada players
CB Murcia players
Competitors at the 1997 Mediterranean Games
FIBA EuroBasket-winning players
FIBA World Championship-winning players
Fortitudo Pallacanestro Bologna players
KK Budućnost coaches
KK Budućnost players
KK Partizan players
Liga ACB players
Mediterranean Games bronze medalists for Yugoslavia
Mediterranean Games medalists in basketball
Montenegrin basketball coaches
Montenegrin expatriate basketball people in Greece
Montenegrin expatriate basketball people in Italy
Montenegrin expatriate basketball people in Serbia
Montenegrin expatriate basketball people in Spain
Montenegrin men's basketball players
Olympic basketball players of Serbia and Montenegro
Olympic basketball players of Yugoslavia
Panathinaikos B.C. players
Panellinios B.C. players
P.A.O.K. BC players
People from Kolašin
Shooting guards